Hyriopsis is a genus of bivalves belonging to the family Unionidae.

The species of this genus are found in Southeastern Asia.

Species:

Hyriopsis altealata 
Hyriopsis bialata 
Hyriopsis bogatchevi 
Hyriopsis cumingii 
Hyriopsis deccanensis 
Hyriopsis delaportei 
Hyriopsis desowitzi 
Hyriopsis hannae 
Hyriopsis khoratensis 
Hyriopsis kratiensis 
Hyriopsis krausi 
Hyriopsis lindholmi 
Hyriopsis mabutii 
Hyriopsis myersiana 
Hyriopsis panhai 
Hyriopsis phuphaniensis 
Hyriopsis sakhonensis 
Hyriopsis schlegelii 
Hyriopsis subschlegeli 
Hyriopsis sulcata 
Hyriopsis velthuizeni

References

Unionidae
Bivalve genera